Amaru is a commune in Buzău County, Muntenia, Romania. It is composed of six villages: Amaru, Câmpeni, Dulbanu, Lacu Sinaia, Lunca and Scorțeanca.

Notes

Communes in Buzău County
Localities in Muntenia